Matt Madden (born 1968 in New York City) is a U.S. comic book writer and artist. He is best known for original alternative comics, for his coloring work in traditional comics, and for the experimental work 99 Ways to Tell a Story: Exercises in Style, which is based on the idea of Raymond Queneau's Exercises in Style. He also teaches comics at the School of Visual Arts and Yale University.

Career
Madden began his career self-publishing minicomics in Ann Arbor, Michigan in the early 1990s.  He was co-editor with Matt Feazell and Sean Bieri of the anthology 5 O'Clock Shadow.  After several of his short pieces appeared in established publications, Madden's first graphic novel, Black Candy, was published by Black Eye Books in 1998. 

In the mid-1990s Madden began writing reviews for The Comics Journal and other publications.  He is a consulting editor for the mini-comic Le Sketch.

He works in illustration and comics coloring and also teaches comics storytelling at the School of Visual Arts.  His graphic novel, Odds Off, was published by Highwater Books, and issue of his periodical series of short works, A Fine Mess, are published by Alternative Comics. 

He regularly deals with themes in settings in Mexico (where he lived for a time in the late 1990s), or that are rooted in Mexican culture.

Madden is OuBaPo's "U.S. correspondent."

Personal life
Madden currently lives in Philadelphia, Pennsylvania with his wife, fellow comics creator Jessica Abel, and their two children. They took a sabbatical in France in August 2012.

Bibliography
Black Candy (Black Eye Books, 1998) 
Odds off, or, L'amour foutu (Highwater Books, 2001) 
A Fine Mess 2 issues (Alternative Comics, 2002–2004)
99 Ways to Tell a Story: Exercises in Style (Chamberlain Bros., 2005) 
Ex Libris: A Comic (Uncivilized Books, 2021) 
Madden, with Jessica Abel, Drawing Words and Writing Pictures, (First Second, 2008) 
Madden (translator), Aristophane, "The Zabime Sisters," (First Second, 2010) 
Madden, with Jessica Abel, Mastering Comics: Drawing Words & Writing Pictures Continued, (First Second, 2012)

References

External links
 
 Le Sketch: mini-comic with Matt Madden's sketches
 A 2005 Interview with Madden
 

Alternative cartoonists
School of Visual Arts faculty
1968 births
Living people
Artists from New York City